Jeong Jae-hee (born 28 April 1994) is a South Korean footballer who plays as midfielder for Pohang Steelers in K League 1.

Career
Jeong joined K League Challenge side FC Anyang in January 2016.

After finishing his military service in Gimcheon Sangmu, he returned to Jeonnam Dragons and led the team to the 2021 Korean FA Cup winners and selected as the MVP of the tournament.

For the 2022 season, he joined Pohang Steelers.

References

External links 

1993 births
Living people
Association football midfielders
South Korean footballers
FC Anyang players
Jeonnam Dragons players
Gimcheon Sangmu FC players
Pohang Steelers players
K League 1 players
K League 2 players